Denisiphantes is a genus of East Asian dwarf spiders containing two species, Denisiphantes denisi and the recently described Denisiphantes arcuatus. The genus was first described by L. H. Tu, S. Q. Li & C. Rollard in 2005, with both species occurring in China.

See also
 List of Linyphiidae species

References

Linyphiidae
Araneomorphae genera
Spiders of China